Manuel Ángel Aguilar Belda (born 16 May 1949 in Bienservida, Albacete) is a Spanish politician. He is a member of the Spanish Socialist Workers' Party.

He obtained a degree in Psychology and Pedagogy, and was Advisor of Health and Social welfare of the Communities of Castilla-La Mancha in 1983. In 1982 he was elected to the Congress representing Albacete. In 1986 he moved to the Spanish Senate remaining a senator until 2000 when he returned to the Congress, however he only served three months before resigning.

External links
 Biography at Spanish Senate site
 Biography at Spanish Congress site

1949 births
Living people
Members of the 2nd Congress of Deputies (Spain)
Members of the 7th Congress of Deputies (Spain)
Spanish Socialist Workers' Party politicians
People from the Province of Albacete
Members of the Senate of Spain